The Azerbaijan Cup 2012–13 is the 21st season of the annual cup competition in Azerbaijan. It started on 23 October 2012 with ten games of the first round and ended on 28 May 2013 with the final. FC Baku were the defending champions, with twenty-one teams competing in this year's competition.

The winner of the competition will qualify for the first qualifying round of the 2013–14 UEFA Europa League.

First round
The games were played on the 22 and 24 October 2012.

Second round
The five winners from the preliminary round joined the remaining eleven teams of the Azerbaijan Premier League in this round, all games were played on 28 November 2012. 

|}

Quarterfinals
The eight winners from the second round were drawn into four two-legged ties. The first legs were played on 27 February 2013 and the second legs on 7 March 2013.

Semifinals
The four quarterfinal winners were drawn into two two-legged semifinal ties. The first legs were played on 17 April 2013, and the second legs on 24 April.

Final

Scorers
4 goals:
 Aghabala Ramazanov, Khazar Lankaran

3 goals:

 Yuriy Fomenko, Kəpəz
 Novruz Alakbarov, Qaradağ

2 goals:

 Māris Verpakovskis, Baku
 Bachana Tskhadadze, Inter Baku
 Rahid Amirguliyev, Khazar Lankaran
 Elvin Yunuszade, Neftchi Baku
 Baxtiyar Fazai, FC Qala
 Vüqar Nadirov, Qarabağ
 Ruhid Yusubov, Qaradağ
 Orxan Babayev, Taraggi

1 goal:

 Shahriyar Aliyev, Baku
 Tural Gurbatov, Baku
 Agil Nabiyev, Baku
 Marius Pena, Baku
 Aleksandar Šolić, Baku
 Nicat Tagiyev, FC Ağsu
 Dodô, Gabala
 Muammer Erdoğdu, Gabala
 Yannick Kamanan, Gabala
 Ilia Kandelaki, Inter Baku
 Ibrahima Niasse, Inter Baku
 Nizami Hajiyev, Inter Baku
 Asif Mammadov, Inter Baku
 Bakhtiyar Soltanov, Kəpəz

 Luciano Olguín, Khazar Lankaran
 Uğur Pamuk, Khazar Lankaran
 Branimir Subašić, Khazar Lankaran
 Elnur Abbasov, Neftchala
 Samir Abdulov, Neftchala
 Araz Abdullayev, Neftchi Baku
 Elshan Abdullayev, Neftchi Baku
 Nicolás Canales, Neftchi Baku
 Flavinho, Neftchi Baku
 Bahodir Nasimov, Neftchi Baku
 Kamil Nurähmädov, Neftchi Baku
 Éric Ramos, Neftchi Baku
 Mahir Shukurov, Neftchi Baku
 Afran Ismayilov, Qarabağ
 Emeka Opara, Qarabağ
 Richard, Qarabağ
 Rufat Mammadov, Qaradağ
 Mehdi Mehdiyev, Qaradağ
 Miloš Adamović, Ravan Baku
 Orkhan Lalayev, Ravan Baku
 Miloš Zečević, Ravan Baku
 Juan Manuel Varea, Ravan Baku
 Ruslan Poladov, Simurq
 Murad Hüseynov, Simurq
 Azar Safarli, Taraggi
 Farmayil Aliyev, Turan Tovuz

1 own goal:
 Bujamin Asani (playing for Kəpəz against Qarabağ)

References
Qarabağ have played their home games at the Tofiq Bahramov Stadium since 1993 due to the ongoing situation in Quzanlı.

External links
Azerbaijan Cup at soccerway.com

Azerbaijan Cup seasons
Azerbaijan Cup
Azerbaijan Cup